Lady Dongyangwon of the Pyeongsan Yu clan was the daughter of Yu Geum-Pil who became the 9th wife of Taejo of Goryeo. Her father was a representative general under his command who showed many achievements, such as helping Taejo on several battlefields and gave the big contribution with participating in the unification of the Later Three Kingdoms and established the new Goryeo dynasty. Both of Yu-Geung (유긍), Yu Gwan-yu (유관유) and Yu-Gyeong (유경) were her brothers. She bore Taejo 2 sons: Wang Ui and Wang Won.

However, her 2nd son was murdered by his half brother, Gwangjong of Goryeo due to Won's rebellion plotted and his two sons (Wang Im and Wang Jeong) were escaped from their death, but after King Mokjong was dethroned and King Hyeonjong took the throne, they were reinstated and placed as an enemy of the Royal household.

In popular culture
Portrayed by Han Bok-hee in the 2002–2003 KBS TV series The Dawn of the Empire.

References

External links
동양원부인 on Encykorea .

Year of birth unknown
Year of death unknown
Consorts of Taejo of Goryeo
People from North Hwanghae